Tabernaemontana rupicola is a species of plant in the family Apocynaceae. It is found in northern South America.

References

rupicola